The 2020 Forward Madison FC season is the second season in the soccer team's history, where they compete in the third division of American soccer, USL League One, the second season of that competition. Due to the COVID-19 pandemic, Forward Madison FC play their home games in 2020 at Hart Park, located in Wauwatosa, Wisconsin, United States.

Club

Roster 

Coaching staff

Front Office Staff

Transfers

Transfers In

Transfers Out

Kits
 Shirt sponsor: Dairyland Insurance
 Sleeve sponsor: Just Coffee Cooperative
 Shirt manufacturer: Hummel

Competitions

Exhibitions

USL League One

Standings

Results summary

Results by round

Match results

U.S. Open Cup 

As a USL League One club, Forward Madison was to enter the competition in the Second Round, which was to be played April 7–9. The tournament was cancelled due to the COVID-19 pandemic.

Statistics

Appearances and goals

Goalscorers

Clean sheets

Disciplinary record

References

Forward Madison
Forward Madison
Forward Madison
Forward Madison